P. S. Karthikeyan (January 1918 – January 24, 1983) was an Indian politician who was a member of the Kerala Legislative Assembly. He was a member of the Indian National Congress. Former Secretary, S.N. Trust, Former Director of SNDP Yogam.

References

1918 births
1983 deaths
Indian National Congress politicians from Kerala
Members of the Kerala Legislative Assembly
People from Alappuzha district